Tweed Roosevelt (born February 28, 1942) is the great-grandson of President Theodore Roosevelt via Roosevelt's son Archibald Bulloch Roosevelt, and his son Archibald (Jr).  He is Chairman of Roosevelt China Investments, a Boston firm. He occasionally lectures and writes on the topic of his great-grandfather. He is the President of the Board of Trustees of the Theodore Roosevelt Association.

Childhood and education
Roosevelt was born in Berkeley, California.  He is the son of the career CIA officer and banker Archibald Bulloch Roosevelt, Jr. (1918-1990) and his first wife, Katherine Winthrop ("K.W." or "Kay") Tweed. His paternal grandfather was Archibald Roosevelt, Sr., the third son of Theodore Roosevelt. His maternal grandfather was Harrison Tweed, the grandson of William M. Evarts.

Roosevelt acquired an interest in natural history at the Millbrook School in Millbrook, New York, and then went on to Harvard where he studied social anthropology and graduated in 1964 with an AB in Anthropology and Social Relations. During his freshman year at Harvard, Roosevelt was involved as a driver in an accident that sent two sophomores to the hospital. During the late 1960s, he became active in the movement against the Vietnam war and participated in the 1967 march on the Pentagon. Two years later, he was one of thousands at the Woodstock Festival. Roosevelt was mentioned, by name, in an essay on Time Magazine's 1967 Man of the Year in which he responded to the question on why he was involved as a VISTA volunteer in Harlem, New York with a single word, "individualism". In 1976, Roosevelt earned an MBA in Finance/Banking at Columbia University.

Early career

From 1967 to 1974, Roosevelt worked in a number of capacities.  He was a special assistant to the Administrator of the largest New York City government agency.  He worked as staff administrator and treasurer of a non-partisan commission studying the selection process of U.S. presidential nominees. He also worked as a VISTA volunteer involved in community action and anti-drug programs in the slums of New York City, and spent some time in the employ of the United States Forest Service at the Carson National Forest in Taos, New Mexico.

Post MBA career
After obtaining his MBA, at the Graduate School of Business, Columbia University, Roosevelt, from 1976 to 1979, was a lecturer in business at that same school. He also designed and taught the basic quantitative course for MBAs.  He also directed and taught in executive programs for middle and upper-level business executives from all over the world.  And he also served as Executive Director of the Institute for Quantitative Research in Finance, an academic research organization which published scholarly papers and organized semi-annual seminars for practitioners and academics involved in the quantitative aspects of finance.  From 1979 to 1983, Roosevelt was consultant with the MAC Group, a general management consulting firm with 150 professionals in offices in the U.S. and abroad.  Tweed was responsible for the practice area of management development; designing and marketing tailored programs for senior managers in the U.S. and overseas.

From 1983 to 1987 Roosevelt was vice president at Gray-Judson & Howard, Inc, a management consulting firm which provides strategic planning advice to domestic and international clients in both the industrial and service sectors.  Projects that Roosevelt directed or participated in included:  developing and implementing strategic planning processes for a number of regional brokerage firms; developing a strategic financial profit model for a major law firm; analyzing the market planning system for an international health and fitness service organization; and consulting with other clients including Computervision (a manufacturer of CAS/CAM systems), J. T. Luptin (the largest Coca-Cola franchise bottler in the U.S.), Allied Signal Corporation, Kodak, Mutual Life of Canada, and Cardio Fitness Corporation.

As an investment advisor at the Wingate Financial Group from 1987–1992, Roosevelt provided financial planning advice to individuals, managing their investments, advising them on real estates, and arranging all aspects of their financial affairs.  He also provided investment banking services to small companies, arranging both short-term and long-term financing.

From 1992 to 1996, Roosevelt served as president of the Roosevelt Investment Group, Inc, a registered investment advisor with offices in New York City and Boston, Massachusetts, with individual and institutional clients both in the United States and abroad. It manages clients' portfolios, investing mostly in U.S. equity and bond market.  The firm, founded by P. James Roosevelt in 1969, is today no longer under the control of the Roosevelt family.

From 1996 to 1998, Roosevelt was a vice president at the Center for Blood Research, a basic research institution affiliated with the Harvard Medical School, funded by Federal grants mostly by NIH and focusing on immunological research.  Roosevelt was responsible for the overall administration of the Center and for its development efforts.

Roosevelt has also served as spokesperson for Steiff, an international company headquartered in Giengen, Germany that manufactures extremely high quality collectible plush animals, including Teddy Bears.  At the beginning of the 20th century, Steiff was the initiator of the original Teddy Bear, which was named after President Theodore Roosevelt.

As Chairman of Roosevelt China Investments, a Boston firm, he has endeavored, despite setbacks, to establish a presence of Saks Fifth Avenue retail stores in mainland China. Those efforts are ongoing. The firm has missed its originally projected 2008 opening date.

Tweed Roosevelt frequently teaches high school students attending Long Island University's Roosevelt Summer Honor Institute program. He leads them in discussions of various documentaries, literary texts, and also provides tours through Theodore Roosevelt's home in Sagamore Hill, which he grew up in as a child. This is an annual program, that began in the summer of 2019.

Children
Roosevelt married Candace C. MacGuigan, a Chapin School and Barnard College graduate, in 1980. They have two children, Winthrop Roosevelt (born November 12, 1982) and Amanda Roosevelt (born March 11, 1986).

1992 trip down the Rio Roosevelt - River of Doubt
In 1992, Roosevelt spent his 50th birthday rafting down the 1,000-mile Rio Roosevelt in Brazil—a river previously explored by his great-grandfather in 1914 in the Roosevelt-Rondon Scientific Expedition. At that time, Theodore Roosevelt and Colonel Cândido Rondon of the Brazilian Army navigated the river, then called the Rio da Duvida—the River of Doubt—in the heart of the Brazilian rain forest. In a video made about the modern trip, Roosevelt summed the river up saying that "nothing had changed and everything had changed" in the Amazon wilderness during the 78 years between the trips. A camera crew traveled with the latter expedition, resulting in a television documentary.

Contributor to books and projects on Theodore Roosevelt
Roosevelt is a frequent contributor to books and other projects on Theodore Roosevelt. He presented two seminars during Safari Club International (SCI)’s 2005 Convention: Return for the River of Doubt and Theodore Roosevelt Remembered. In 2006, he was also a guest lecturer at the first annual Theodore Roosevelt symposium, "Theodore Roosevelt, Adventurer",  given at Dickinson State University in 2006, speaking on TR's hunting and camping trips in the Western United States. He also spoke at its 2007 Symposium.

A longtime member of the Theodore Roosevelt Association (TRA), Tweed Roosevelt serves on that organization's Executive Committee and is the current President of the organization. In 2007 Roosevelt was asked to head up the organization's site location committee to consider locations for the TRA's since-abandoned Theodore Roosevelt Museum and Research Center. He is also a member of its strategic planning committee.

Roosevelt is a charter member of the New England Chapter of the Theodore Roosevelt Association. He also spoke in 2006 at the Annual Wyoming Commemorative Service on July 4 at the Wyoming Monument in Wyoming, Pennsylvania for the anniversary of his great-grandfather's speech there.

In 2008, he travelled to San Juan, Puerto Rico to unveil a statue of President Theodore Roosevelt commissioned by then Senate President Kenneth McClintock and House Speaker José Aponte, to commemorate the President's visit to Puerto Rico almost a century before.  Tweed's great-uncle, Theodore Roosevelt II, served as Governor of Puerto Rico in the early 20th century.

In May 2009, Roosevelt led the team that coordinated and organized an opportunity for members of the Theodore Roosevelt Association (TRA) to join the US Navy's traditional one-day family cruise on the nuclear aircraft carrier, USS Theodore Roosevelt (CVN-71). Over 700 people attended and more than 200 people joined the TRA just for the opportunity. This was the first such cruise in over ten years in which TRA members participated.  He led another TRA cruise on the CVN-71 in August 2019.

Notes and references

References

See also

William M. Evarts (great-great grandfather)
Theodore Roosevelt (great-grandfather)
Archibald Bulloch Roosevelt (grandfather)
Harrison Tweed (grandfather)
Archibald Bulloch Roosevelt, Jr. (father)

External links
 Theodore Roosevelt Association (TRA) Official Site
 
 New England Chapter of the Theodore Roosevelt Association
 Roosevelt China Investments Corp.
 Roosevelt Investment Group
 "Theodore Roosevelt and America's Place in the World Arena" Symposium at Dickinson State University, 2007
 

Tweed
Harvard University alumni
1942 births
Living people
Columbia Business School alumni
Bulloch family
Winthrop family
American people of Dutch descent
American people of Scottish descent